Crookes Cemetery is a cemetery between Crosspool and Crookes in the city of Sheffield, South Yorkshire, England. Its main entrance is on Headland Road with additional access from Mulehouse Road. By 2009, over 29,000 burials had taken place since its opening.

A central alley runs through the cemetery and separates the consecrated grounds to the north and the unconsecrated grounds to the south.

Cemetery chapel
The foundation stone for the chapel was laid by the Lord Mayor of Sheffield, Harry P. Marsh J.P., on Friday 18 September 1908 at 12.30 pm. He was then presented with a silver trowel by the architects Messrs C. and C.M. Hadfield. The building is constructed from locally quarried stone from the Rivelin Valley, while the dressings around the windows, the tracery and doorways are in Bath stone from the Monk's Park quarry in Corsham, Wiltshire. The roof is covered with heavy slates from the Buttermere Green Slate Company in Cumbria while the mortuary aisle is roofed with arched ribs and slabs from Stuart's Granolithic Stone Co. Ltd. in Edinburgh. The chapel ceiling is groin vaulted while the floor is of terrazzo and wood. Messrs Hadfield's design was carried out by the building contractors D. O'Neill and Son, with C. Heywood as clerk of works. The chapel was Grade II listed in 1995.

War graves
Seventy of the older graves, registered and maintained by the Commonwealth War Graves Commission, are those of armed services personnel who died serving in and during the First World War and the Second World War.

Notable interments
 Henry Boot (1851–1931), founder of Henry Boot plc, a construction company
 Sir Stuart Goodwin (1886–1969), industrialist and philanthropist
 Tommy Ward (1853–1926), Master Cutler and founder of Thos. W. Ward, a shipbreaking company

References

External links

 
 Sheffield Bereavement services

Crookes
Anglican cemeteries in the United Kingdom
Grade II listed buildings in Sheffield